České Meziříčí is a municipality and village in Rychnov nad Kněžnou District in the Hradec Králové Region of the Czech Republic. It has about 2,000 inhabitants.

Administrative parts

Villages of Skršice and Tošov are administrative parts of České Meziříčí.

Notable people
Karel Otčenášek (1920–2011), Catholic bishop

References

External links

Villages in Rychnov nad Kněžnou District